This is a list of castles in Russia.

Northwestern Federal District

Central Federal District

Other Districts

See also
List of castles

Russia
Russia
Castles
Russia
Castles